Battle of Sarvan is a battle took place between the National Army of the Azerbaijan Democratic Republic and the 11th Army at the "Sarvan" station of Sharana District  on April 27, 1920.

Battle 
After the beginning of the occupation of Azerbaijan by the Bolshevik army, the train of the XI Red Army was forcibly stopped at the "Sarvan" station by the group led by Ghachak Mayil. Defeated after the Battle of Yalama, the leader of the anti-revolutionary group, Gachag Mayil, discusses ending the resistance. But Mayil's son Ibrahim, who serves in the National Army of the Azerbaijan Democratic Republic, objects to this. After that, the place for the second battle is chosen. This time, the rails are being dismantled at the Sarvan station of Devechi (now Shabran). The armed men are taking positions. Around noon, the train carrying the Red Army arrives. Thanks to the dismantled rails, erected barricades and armed residents, the movement of the army is stopped. At the same time, an appeal is made from the train through a loudspeaker:

The person who appealed to the militants from the train was Hamdulla Afandi's cousin, Ibrahim's schoolmate and Mir Jafar Baghirov's foster brother Gazanfar Musabekov. After Musabeyov's appeal, the shooting stopped and Musabeyov got out of the train and began to speak:

After  Musabekov returned to the train, Ibrahim Bey opened fire on the train and a fight began. The Bolsheviks, firing machine guns, were able to suppress the local population, who attacked in a scattered manner, in a short period of time. Mayil, who led the group, saw that they were defeated and retreated to Babadag with the survivors.

See also 
 Battle of Yalama

References

20th century in Azerbaijan
1920 in Azerbaijan
Battles involving Azerbaijan Democratic Republic